Dariyabad may refer to:

 Dariyabad, Barabanki, Uttar Pradesh, India
 Dariyabad, Allahabad, Uttar Pradesh, India
 Dariyabad (Assembly constituency)